Tour Pacific (previously known as Tour Arcelor or Japan Tower) is an office skyscraper in Puteaux, in La Défense, the business district of the Paris metropolitan area.

The Tower, which originally bore the name of Japan Tower, is one of the achievements of Christian Pellerin, who entrusted the design to the Kurokawa-Inoue duo in 1986.

In May 2013, the Quebec group Ivanhoe-Cambridge, the real estate branch of the Caisse des Dépôts du Quebec, and owner of the tower, sold it for 215 million euros to an American group.

See also 
 La Défense
 List of tallest buildings and structures in the Paris region
 List of tallest buildings in France

References

External links 
 Tour Pacific

Pacific
La Défense
Office buildings completed in 1992
20th-century architecture in France